Sonya Jeyaseelan / Maja Matevžič were the defending champions.

Seeds

Draw

External links
 Draw (ITF) 

2004 Internationaux de Strasbourg Singles
2004 WTA Tour
2004 in French tennis